Selena + Chef is an American streaming television cooking show hosted by Selena Gomez that premiered on HBO Max on August 13, 2020. The first season consists of 10 episodes. In August 2020, the series was renewed for a second season, which premiered on November 19, 2020 and continues into early 2021. In April 2021, the series was renewed for a third season which was released on October 28, 2021. In November 2021, the series was renewed for a fourth season which premiered on August 18, 2022.

Premise
Selena Gomez stars in cooking series filmed in her home. Each episode features Selena tackling a new cuisine and guest stars a different professional chef, where they cover tips and tricks and how to deal with disasters in the kitchen. For each episode, the show donates $10,000 to the charity of the Chef's choice, often food related.

Cast
Selena Gomez stars as the host of the series. Confirmed guests for the first season include: 
 Ludo Lefebvre
 Antonia Lofaso
 Candice Kumai
 Roy Choi
 Jon Shook
 Vinny Dotolo
 Nancy Silverton
 Angelo Sosa
 Tanya Holland
 Daniel Holzman
 Nyesha Arrington

Confirmed guests for the second season include:
Curtis Stone
JJ Johnson
José Andrés
Marcus Samuelsson
Kelis Rogers
Jordan Andino
Marcela Valladolid
Evan Funke
Graham Elliot
Aarti Sequeira

Confirmed guests for the third season include:
Kwame Onwuachi
Ayesha Curry
Aarón Sánchez
Fabio Viviani
Richard Blais
Padma Lakshmi
Esther Choi
Sophia Roe
Gabe Kennedy
Jamie Oliver

Confirmed guests for the fourth season include:
 Ludo Lefebvre
 Kristen Kish
 DeVonn Francis
 Rachael Ray
 Nick DiGiovanni
 Adrienne Cheatham
 Matty Matheson
 Priya Krishna
 Paola Velez
 Gordon Ramsay

Special guests
 Nana Cornett
 Papa Cornett
 Liz Golden
 Raquelle Stevens
 Theresa Mingus
 Paige Reed
 Fox Martindale (season 3)
 Gracie Elliot Teefey (season 3–present)
 Anna Collins (season 3)
 Kelsey Klingensmith (season 4)
 Connar Franklin (season 4)
 Ashley Cook (season 4)

Episodes

Series overview

Season 1 (2020)

Season 2 (2020–21)

Season 3 (2021)

Season 4 (2022)

Production
On May 5, 2020, HBO Max gave a greenlight for 10-episode cooking series hosted by Selena Gomez, and developed by Aaron Saidman. Gomez executive produced the series alongside Eli Holzman, Leah Hariton, and Saidman. The series concept was inspired by Gomez's own experience and struggles with cooking for herself while in quarantine, and the producers were committed to documenting this in a way that was "unrehearsed, unfiltered and truly unscripted." On August 27, 2020, HBO Max renewed the series for a second season. On April 23, 2021, HBO Max renewed the series for a third season. On November 10, 2021, HBO Max renewed the series for a fourth season.

Filmed during the COVID-19 pandemic, strict safety protocols were followed, with no crew members ever present in Gomez's kitchen. The chefs featured in each episode appear remotely.

Release
The series premiered on August 13, 2020 on HBO Max. The second season premiered on November 19, 2020 and continued with more episodes on January 21, 2021. The third season was released on October 28, 2021. The fourth season was released on August 18, 2022, with the first three episodes available, followed by three more episodes each on August 25, and then the final four episodes on September 1, 2022.

Reception

Critical response
For the first season, review aggregator Rotten Tomatoes reported an approval rating of 100% based on 5 critic reviews, with an average rating of 6/10.

Awards and nominations

International versions

References

External links
 Selena + Chef on HBO Max
 
 
 

2020s American cooking television series
2020 American television series debuts
English-language television shows
Selena Gomez
HBO Max original programming
Television series impacted by the COVID-19 pandemic